Samuel Okon Ikon  (born 1 February 1973 in Etinan, Akwa Ibom) is a Nigerian politician who represents Etinan, Nsit Ibom and Nsit Ubium in the Nigerian National Assembly. Between 2007 and 2011 he was the speaker of the Akwa Ibom State House of Assembly.

Education 
Ikon attended Federal Government College, Ikot Ekpene. In 1995, he graduated from University of Calabar with a BSc in Economics, and in 2004, he obtained an MBA from University of Uyo.

Scandal 
In June 2016, Ikon and two other members of the Nigerian National Assembly were accused of sexual misconduct and attempted rape while on a leadership training in Cleveland, Ohio by the U.S Ambassador to Nigeria James Entwist. Ikon denied the accusations and threatened to sue Entwist and the American government if the accusation was not retracted. The Nigerian National Assembly ethics committee opened an investigation into the accusation. After much Investigations Samuel Ikon was found not guilty of the accusations by the ethics committee.

References

1973 births
Living people
Akwa Ibom State politicians